Let's Talk It Over is a 1934 American pre-Code comedy-drama film directed by Kurt Neumann and starring Chester Morris, Mae Clarke and Frank Craven.

Plot summary
A sailor rescues a young heiress who is apparently drowning. Little does he know she was only pretending to catch the eye of another man.

Partial cast
 Chester Morris as Mike McGann  
 Mae Clarke as Pat Rockland  
 Frank Craven as Mr. Rockland  
 John Warburton as Alex Winters  
 Irene Ware as Sandra  
 Andy Devine as Gravel  
 Russ Brown as Bill  
 Anderson Lawler as Peter  
 Goodee Montgomery as Helen Wray  
 Douglas Fowley as Sailor Jones  
 Jane Darwell as Mrs. O'Keefe 
 Willard Robertson as Dr. Preston  
 Frank Reicher as Richards  
 Henry Armetta as Tony  
 Otis Harlan as Purser

References

Bibliography
 Dick, Bernard F. City of Dreams: The Making and Remaking of Universal Pictures. University Press of Kentucky, 2015.

External links
 

1934 films
1934 comedy-drama films
American comedy-drama films
Films directed by Kurt Neumann
American black-and-white films
Films produced by B. F. Zeidman
1930s English-language films
1930s American films